Major League Baseball 2K8 Fantasy All-Stars is the Nintendo DS spin-off of Major League Baseball 2K8 in the vein of MLB Power Pros, developed by Canadian studio Deep Fried Entertainment and published by 2K Sports. It was released on April 14, 2008.

Gameplay

The game extensively utilizes the Nintendo DS touchscreen, which controls the power and technique of bat swings and the speed and accuracy of pitches. Fielding, baserunning and other controls will also utilize the DS touch screen, by dragging and tracing lines to execute those baseball actions.

The game also features the ability to obtain special "power-ups", which can increase batting, pitching and fielding skill, as well a "chicken ball" that causes the opponents to chase a decoy ball, and a "crazy ball" that causes a batted ball to take a knuckleball-like flight. Power up pitches include a "super splitter" (that splits the ball into two pieces) and a literal "fireball". Fielding power ups include a "brick wall" that instantly stops a ball and a "super jump" to catch high line drives or rob home runs.

Features
Other features include: 
Exhibition mode, for quick play and scenario set ups
Fantasy Pennant mode, a tournament mode
80 fictional teams
Themed Stadiums, fantasy ballfields
All-Star Training, a tutorial mode to teach the player how to use the touch pad with the game

Multiplayer
MLB 2K8 Fantasy All-Stars supports two-player DS Wireless Play

Cover athlete

As with MLB 2K8, José Reyes is the cover athlete, in cartoon form.

Reception

The game received "mixed" reviews according to the review aggregation website Metacritic.

See also
Major League Baseball 2K9 Fantasy All-Stars
Major League Baseball 2K8
MLB Power Pros
MLB Stickball
2K Sports Major League Baseball series

References

External links
 

2008 video games
2K Sports games
Deep Fried Entertainment games
Fantasy sports video games
Major League Baseball video games
Multiplayer and single-player video games
Nintendo DS games
Nintendo DS-only games
North America-exclusive video games
Take-Two Interactive games
Video games developed in Canada